Pemangkat (Chinese: 邦戛, Pinyin: Bāngjiá) is a coastal town in West Kalimantan, Indonesia. It is located in the northwest of the provincial capital Pontianak.

Demographic
Most of the Pemangkat population are Malay and Tionghoa. The natives of Pemangkat are commonly referred to in Hakka language as Pangkatnyin, meaning people of Pemangkat.

Geography
Pemangkat has a famous temple, which is located on the Elephant mount. This temple is a worship place to a god whom local Chinese believe to be protecting fishermen when sailing out on the sea. This small town still practices many traditional Chinese cultures which can rarely be seen in other places. It has many natural resorts, such as Selindung waterfall, Tanjung Batu beach and Sinam beach.

Populated places in West Kalimantan